Adèle de Ponthieu is a French-language opera by the composer Niccolò Piccinni, first performed at the Académie Royale de Musique, Paris (the Paris Opera) on 27 October 1781, to inaugurate the new venue of the theatre near the Saint-Martin gate. It takes the form of a tragédie lyrique in three acts. The libretto, by Jean-Paul-André des Rasins de Saint-Marc, had been  previously set by the composers Jean-Benjamin de La Borde and Pierre Montan Berton in 1772.

Roles

References
Notes

Sources
 1782 libretto: Adele de Ponthieu, Tragédie-lyrique en trois actes, Remise en Musique par M. Piccini, Paris, Michel, 1782 (copy at Warwick Digital Library)
 Spire Pitou, The Paris Opéra. An Encyclopedia of Operas, Ballets, Composers, and Performers – Rococo and Romantic, 1715-1815, Greenwood Press, Westport/London, 1985. 
  Félix Clément and Pierre Larousse Dictionnaire des Opéras, p. 6

1781 operas
Operas
French-language operas
Operas by Niccolò Piccinni
Tragédies en musique